The Chery Tiggo 3x is a subcompact crossover produced by Chery based on the Chery Fulwin 2 hatchback. It is called Chery Tiggo 2 in Brazil and Chile.

Overview
The Chery Tiggo 3x was unveiled on the 2016 Beijing Auto Show. Pricing starts from 58,900 yuan to 83,900 yuan making the crossover the cheapest product of the Chery Tiggo crossover series. The Chery Tiggo 3X was initially only available with a 1.5 liter petrol engine producing 106hp and 135nm, mated to a five-speed manual transmission or a four-speed automatic transmission. A 1.2 liter turbo engine was available from early 2017 producing 150 hp. The 1.2 liter turbo engine is mated to a six-speed manual transmission or CVT. The Tiggo 3x was positioned directly under the Tiggo 3 and was aimed to be the sportier version of the Tiggo 3 despite being a completely different vehicle.

Chery Tiggo 3x Plus
The Chery Tiggo 3x received a facelift variant in August 2020 called the Chery Tiggo 3x Plus. the Tiggo 3x Plus was designed with the “Life In Motion 3.0” design language and features a redesigned front fascia compare to the pre-facelift model. The engine is a 1.5 liter naturally aspirated inline-4 engine developing 116 hp（85 kW）and 143 N·m mated to either a manual transmission or a CVT. A turbocharged 3-cylinder 1.0L engine is used in Brazil, with flexfuel capability and mated only to the CVT.

Tiggo 3xe (3x EV)
The Tiggo 3x EV is based on the Tiggo 3x. Exterior styling remains largely the same with some blue accents in the headlights and a blue line in the grilles.

References

External links
Official website

2010s cars
Cars introduced in 2016
Cars of China
Cars of Brazil
Tiggo 3x
Crossover sport utility vehicles
Front-wheel-drive vehicles
Mini sport utility vehicles
Production electric cars